is a former Japanese football player.

Playing career
Nakamura was born in Kumamoto Prefecture on April 5, 1981. After graduating from high school, he joined J1 League club Kashima Antlers in 2000. On May 3, he debuted as substitute forward from the 82nd minute against Verdy Kawasaki. However he could hardly play in the match until 2002. In 2003, he moved to J2 League club Montedio Yamagata. He played many matches and scored 11 goals in 2003. However he could not play many matches in 2004. In 2005, he moved to J1 club Albirex Niigata. However he could not play at all in the match. In June 2005, he moved to Albirex Niigata Singapore on loan and played many matches. In 2006, he returned to Albirex Niigata. However he could not play at all in the match and retired end of 2006 season.

Club statistics

References

External links

awx.jp

1981 births
Living people
Association football people from Kumamoto Prefecture
Japanese footballers
J1 League players
J2 League players
Kashima Antlers players
Montedio Yamagata players
Albirex Niigata players
Association football forwards